The RN-15 National Highway connects from Obock to Eritrean Border, and is  long, it runs along most of the Bab-el-Mandeb coastline. It is the longest route in Obock Region.

References

Roads in Djibouti